Dongsheng District (Mongolian:   Düŋšėŋ toɣoriɣ; ; alternate spelling English: Koshang; Turkic: Košang) is a District and the seat of Ordos City, Inner Mongolia, People's Republic of China. It has a district population of 574,242. The district is predominantly Han Chinese, but has a significant Mongol minority.

History

Dongsheng is also the fastest growing district of Ordos City, half of the district being under construction. To enable further expansion, officials in 2003 planned the nearby district of Kangbashi, a brand new (city)  from Dongsheng.

Geography
Ordos's prefectural administrative region occupies 86,752 square kilometres (33,495 sq mi) and covers the bigger part of the Ordos Desert, although the urban area itself is relatively small. The region borders the prefectures of Hohhot to the east, Baotou to the northeast, Bayan Nur to the north, Alxa League to the northwest, Wuhai to the west, the Ningxia Hui Autonomous Region to its southwest, and the provinces of Shaanxi and Shanxi to the south.

Transportation 
China National Highway 210

References

External links
Dongsheng Government Website

County-level divisions of Inner Mongolia
Ordos City